Colin William Lambert (born August 1958) is a British politician and schoolteacher, who served as Leader of Rochdale Metropolitan Borough Council from 2010 until 2014.

Early life and career
Lambert joined the Labour Party in the mid-1970s as a student. He later qualified as a teacher and became involved with teaching unions. He taught in Rochdale for 20 years.

Political career
Lambert was a councillor from 2 May 1997 to 5 May 2016, representing the Heywood West ward. On the council cabinet, he represented Children, Schools and Families, when Rochdale was the fourth-worst local education authority in England. On 17 December 2010, nine Liberal Democrat councillors resigned from their party and left their coalition with the Conservatives on the council, leaving Labour as the biggest party on the council with Lambert as council leader. In the 2011 council election, Labour remained the largest party and with 29 out of 60 councillors. On 3 June 2014, he resigned as council leader, two days after celebrating 1,000 days in the role.

Lambert joined the Brexit Party in 2019 and was their parliamentary candidate for Heywood and Middleton in the 2019 general election. He received 3,952 votes and came third behind the Conservatives and Labour respectively.

Personal life
Lambert is married with two children and lives in Broadhalgh. He enjoys walking as a hobby.

References

External links
 Rochdale Borough Council
 IMDb

1958 births
Councillors in Greater Manchester
Schoolteachers from Greater Manchester
Labour Party (UK) councillors
Local government in the Metropolitan Borough of Rochdale
People from Rochdale
Living people
Reform UK parliamentary candidates
21st-century English politicians
Leaders of local authorities of England